Tales of the Slayers is a Dark Horse Comics Buffy the Vampire Slayer graphic novel that consists of multiple stories written by Joss Whedon, Amber Benson, and others which tell of different members of the Slayer line.

The stories are presented in chronological order and offer snapshots of Slayers throughout history, from The First Slayer to Melaka Fray (the Slayer of the future who starred in her own limited comic series). The overarching theme of the graphic novel is on the loneliness and duties of being the Slayer. This is reflected in the juxtaposition of the first line in the first short story ("I am alone"), and the final line in the last ("I am not alone").

This graphic novel was followed by the one-shot comic book Tales of the Slayers: Broken Bottle of Djinn that followed the same concept. Tales of the Slayers and Tales of the Vampires have been collected with "Broken Bottle of Djinn" in a 2011 Hardback collection titled 'Tales'.

Publication

See also
 Tales of the Slayers: Broken Bottle of Djinn one-shot comic book
 Tales of the Vampires comic book limited series

References

External links
 Tales of the Slayers at Dark Horse Comics

Buffyverse
Buffyverse comic book crossovers
Comics based on Buffy the Vampire Slayer
Comics by Joss Whedon
Fantasy comics
Horror comics